Lam Siu-hang (born 12 December 1996) is a Hong Kong table tennis player.

Achievements

ITTF Tours
Men's doubles

References

Hong Kong male table tennis players
1996 births
Living people
Table tennis players at the 2018 Asian Games
Asian Games competitors for Hong Kong
Table tennis players at the 2020 Summer Olympics
Olympic table tennis players of Hong Kong